Luxembourgers in Chicago are an ethnic group in the Chicagoland area.

History
The first Luxembourgers to come to Chicago immigrated in either 1842 or 1846. 

In 1871, just after the Great Chicago Fire parishioners of St. Michael's Church in Chicago formed the first Luxembourgish-American organization in the United States, the Luxemburger Unterstützungsverein (Luxembourg Mutual Aid Society). Other organizations followed such as the Luxembourg Bruderbund. Many Luxembourgers were Roman Catholics, and the first initial wave of immigrants lived alongside Germans in places like Old Town, later seeking to distinguish themselves from the Germans. After the fire, they moved further north to areas like Rogers Park. Around 1900, there were around 16,000 Luxembourgers in Chicago.

"Greenhouse poeple"

Many Luxembourgers became involved in the growing of plants in greenhouses, so much so that by 1910, most of the 100 greenhouses in Chicago were owned by Luxembourgish Americans. Some are still in operation to the present day.

Cultural institutions

St. Gregory the Great church founded in 1904.

St. Michael Church

Angel Guardian Orphanage, which later closed in 1975 and gave a portion of its land to Misericordia Home

Luxembourg Brotherhood of America holds the following events each year: 
 An annual Mass celebrating Our Lady of Consolation, Patroness of Luxembourg.
 Sauerbraten Dinner in the Spring.
 The National Convention in May.
The Schobermesse / National Day in June based on the Schueberfouer holiday started in 1340 by John the Blind in Luxembourg.

Luxembourg Independent Club of Chicago

Luxemburger Zeitung, later known as the Luxembourg Weekly, began publication in Chicago in 1899, with national subscription by mail beginning in 1902. It is still published, under the name Luxembourg News of America. 

Luxembourg-American Social Club was founded in Chicago in 1960

Notable people
Emil G. Hirsch
Matthew Woll
Red Faber
John L. May
William Heirens

See Also
Luxembourgish Americans

References

Luxembourgian emigrants to the United States
Luxembourgian-American history